

Medalists

Heats

Semifinals

Final

References
Results

800 metres at the World Athletics Indoor Championships
800 metres Women
2008 in women's athletics